Porgi grunt is an English common name used in Jamaica for several species of fish such as:

Saucereye porgy (Calamus calamus)
Jolthead porgy (Calamus bojanado)

Fish common names